Snow Dome may refer to:

Places
 Snow Dome (Canada), a mountain in Alberta and British Columbia, Canada
 Snow Dome, Concordia, a mountain in Concordia in Gilgit–Baltistan, Pakistan
 Snow Dome, Chaprot, a mountain in Chaprot Pass in Gilgit–Baltistan, Pakistan
 Snow Dome, Bispingen, an indoor ski slope in Bispingen, Germany

See also
 Snow globe, a transparent sphere enclosing a miniaturized scene
 Snowdome (disambiguation)